Madi Township is a township in Longsheng Various Nationalities Autonomous County, Guangxi, China.

Etymology
Madi Township, formerly known as "Mati Township", because a large stone like horseshoe in the township.

Administrative division
As of 2016, the township is divided into eight villages: 
 Madi  
 Niutou  
 Baiwan  
 Zhangjia  
 Longjia  
 Furong  
 Lishi  
 Dongsheng

History
It was incorporated as a township in 1984.

Geography
Madi Township is situated at northeastern Longsheng Various Nationalities Autonomous County. It borders Chengbu Miao Autonomous County in the north, Jiangdi Township in the east, Sishui Township in the south, and Weijiang Township in the west.

Economy
The economy is supported primarily by farming and ranching.

Transportation
The Provincial Highway S219 is a south-north highway in the town.

References

Bibliography

Townships of Guilin